Pete Sampras defeated Cédric Pioline in the final, 6–4, 6–2, 6–4 to win the gentlemen's singles tennis title at the 1997 Wimbledon Championships. It was his fourth Wimbledon title.

Richard Krajicek was the defending champion, but lost in the fourth round to Tim Henman.

Former champions Pat Cash and Michael Stich made their respective final appearances in the main draw of a major.

This was the second year in Wimbledon history, after 1991, that there was play on the Middle Sunday, due to bad weather in the first week. The standout match on the Middle Sunday was the epic third round match where British favourite Tim Henman defeated Dutchman Paul Haarhuis 6–7(7–9), 6–3, 6–2, 4–6, 14–12, after Henman had been match point down earlier in the fifth set.

Seeds

  Pete Sampras (champion)
  Goran Ivanišević (second round)
  Yevgeny Kafelnikov (fourth round)
  Richard Krajicek (fourth round)
  Michael Chang (first round)
  Thomas Muster (withdrew)
  Mark Philippoussis (first round)
  Boris Becker (quarterfinals)
  Marcelo Ríos (fourth round)
  Carlos Moyá (second round)
  Gustavo Kuerten (first round)
  Pat Rafter (fourth round)
  Andriy Medvedev (third round)
  Tim Henman (quarterfinals)
  Wayne Ferreira (third round)
  Petr Korda (fourth round)
  Jonas Björkman (first round)

Thomas Muster withdrew due to injury. He was replaced in the draw by the highest-ranked non-seeded player Jonas Björkman, who became the #17 seed.

Qualifying

Draw

Finals

Top half

Section 1

Section 2

Section 3

Section 4

Bottom half

Section 5

Section 6

Section 7

Section 8

References

External links

 1997 Wimbledon Championships – Men's draws and results at the International Tennis Federation

Men's Singles
Wimbledon Championship by year – Men's singles